The coinage of the United Belgian States was only produced during the state's one-year existence in 1790, following the Brabant Revolution, but provided a strong numismatic influence for the coinage of Belgium after its independence in 1830.

Background

In 1789, Brabant Revolution took place in reaction to liberal reforms made by Joseph II and the Austrian rule in Belgium. After Austrian forces were defeated by the rebels at the Battle of Turnhout in 1789, Austrian forces withdrew from the country leaving the rebels in power. On 11 January 1790, with the signing of the Treaty of Union, the counties and dukedoms which had made up the Austrian Netherlands became one country: the United Belgian States.

Coinage
The coinage was issued in eight denominations  divided into Liards, Sols, and Florins. It was only produced during the short one-year lifespan of the country meaning that all examples are dated 1790. Legends are rendered in Latin.

The types minted were:

Iconography
The iconography on the coinage stressed the unity of the state. On the 3 Florin, this was represented by the individual display of all the coats-of-arms of the 11 states which had merged; on the 10 sols, it was represented by 11 arrows behind a two shaking hands.

References

Further reading

External links

 Révolution Brabançonne at iBelgica
 De Verenigde Belgische Staten at Numismatica-herentals
 The first "Belgian" coins: Lions d'or and lions d'argent of the United Belgian States at the National Bank of Belgium (NBB) Museum

Coinage
United States of Belgium
Coins of Belgium

fr:États belgiques unis#Les pièces de monnaies des États belgiques unis